Van Cortlandt may refer to:

Van Cortlandt family, of New York, including a list of people in the family

Places
Van Cortlandt House Museum, Bronx, New York
Van Cortlandt Park, Bronx, New York
Van Cortlandt Park–242nd Street station, a New York City Subway station, served by the  train
Van Cortlandt Manor, Westchester County, New York
Van Cortlandt Village, a subsection of the Kingsbridge neighborhood, Bronx, New York

See also
Cortlandt (disambiguation)
Van Cortlandtville, in Cortlandt, New York

Surnames of Dutch origin